Anatoliy Moroz (born 6 February 1948 in Berdychiv, Ukrainian SSR) is a former Soviet track and field athlete who competed in the high jump. He was the silver medallist at the 1966 European Junior Games before going on to win the gold medal at the 1967 European Indoor Games.

International competitions

See also
List of European Athletics Indoor Championships medalists (men)

References

Living people
1948 births
Soviet male high jumpers